Sir Abraham Elton, 1st Baronet (1654 – 9 February 1728), of Clevedon Court and Whitestaunton, Somerset, was an English politician.

He was the second son of Isaac Elton, Yeoman of Barton Regis, Bristol.  His elder brother Jacob died in 1676 at the age of 30.

He was elected Mayor of Bristol for 1710–11, pricked High Sheriff of Gloucestershire for 1715–16 and created a baronet in the following year. He was elected Member (MP) of the Parliament of England for Bristol for 1722–1727.

Elton died in 1728. He  married Mary, the daughter of Robert Jefferies of Pile Green, Gloucestershire, with whom he had 3 sons and a daughter. He was succeeded in the baronetcy by his eldest son Abraham

References

1654 births
1728 deaths
Baronets in the Baronetage of Great Britain
Mayors of Bristol
People from Somerset
British MPs 1722–1727
High Sheriffs of Gloucestershire